Stephen Barber (born 1974) is a British political scientist, political economist and author.  He is  Professor of Global Affairs at Regent's University London. He is also a senior fellow at the Global Policy Institute. He has also worked in the European Research Forum and is a former director of MBA. He is a specialist in British public policy and party politics, political economy and having worked in the City of London, the globalisation of financial markets. He holds a BA in government, an MA in contemporary history and a PhD in political science, awarded by several London universities.  He is a Fellow of the Royal Historical Society and Member of the Securities & Investment Institute.  Following the Northern Rock and banking credit crisis in 2008, he outlined his concept of a regulatory cycle of economic behaviour.

He wrote and presented the [Radio 4] programme 'The Case for Doing Nothing' which was broadcast in October 2016.

Publications
 Political Strategy: modern politics in contemporary Britain (2005) 
 The City in Europe and the World (2005) (editor)
 The Geo-Politics of the City (2007) (editor)
 Greed (2009) (editor with Alexis Brassey)
 Tragedy of Riches: how our politics has failed us and why we need a new economic destiny (2011)
 Westminster, Governance and the Politics of Policy Inaction: Do Nothing (2016)

References

External links
The Global Policy Institute at London Metropolitan University 
Liverpool Academic Press
Greed page at Palgrave Macmillan
Profile at London South Bank University website
BBC

1974 births
Living people
British political scientists
Academics of London Metropolitan University
Academics of London South Bank University
Fellows of the Royal Historical Society